Agardhiella is a genus of terrestrial gastropods belonging to the family Agardhiellidae.

The species of this genus are found in Southern Europe.

Species

Agardhiella armata 
Agardhiella banatica 
Agardhiella biarmata 
 Agardhiella caesa (Westerlund, 1878)
 Agardhiella crassilabris (Grossu & Negrea, 1969)
 Agardhiella dabovici E. Gittenberger, 1975
 Agardhiella domokosi Subai, 2011
 Agardhiella extravaganta Subai, 2008
 Agardhiella formosa (L. Pfeiffer, 1848)
 Agardhiella grossui (Zilch, 1958)
 Agardhiella incerta Grossu, 1986
 Agardhiella johanni E. Gittenberger, 2015
 Agardhiella joschmidti A. Reischütz, N. Steiner-Reischütz & P. L. Reischütz, 2019
 Agardhiella lamellata (Clessin, 1887)
 Agardhiella langaleta Subai, 2011
 Agardhiella macrodonta (P. Hesse, 1916)
 Agardhiella mista A. Reischütz, N. Steiner-Reischütz & P. L. Reischütz, 2016
 Agardhiella parreyssii (L. Pfeiffer, 1848)
 Agardhiella pirotana Subai, 2011
 Agardhiella reinhardti (Zilch, 1958)
 Agardhiella serbica Subai, 2011
 Agardhiella skipetarica (A. J. Wagner, 1914)
 Agardhiella stenostoma (Flach, 1890)
 Agardhiella truncatella (L. Pfeiffer, 1841)
 Agardhiella tunde Deli, 2010
 Agardhiella zoltanorum Subai, 2008
Species brought into synonymy
 Agardhiella licherdopoli Grossu, 1986: synonym of Agardhiella parreyssii (L. Pfeiffer, 1848) (junior synonym)
 Agardhiella prahovensis <small>Grossu, 1986</small: synonym of Agardhiella lamellata (Clessin, 1887) (junior synonym)

References

 Hesse, P. (1923). Kritische Fragmente. XXV. Fruticocampylaea (?) pratensis Pfr. XXVI. Nomenklaturfragen. XXVII. Das Genus Aegopina Kob. Archiv für Molluskenkunde, 55 (5): 193–198. Frankfurt am Main
 Bank, R. A. (2017). Classification of the Recent terrestrial Gastropoda of the World. Last update: July 16, 2017

Pupilloidea